Dusona is a genus of parasitoid wasps belonging to the family Ichneumonidae. It is the most species rich genus of the subfamily Campopleginae with 442 known species.

The genus has cosmopolitan distribution.

Description
Dusona is an easily recognized genus among other Campopleginae due to a number of clear diagnostic characteristics which include: elongated, oval or slit-shaped propodeal spiracles; a very strongly compressed metasoma; closed areolets and petiolar sutures that are often obliterated or positioned very low anteriorly. Additionally are many species able to reach unusually large body sizes, some exceeding 20 mm (see Dusona falcator). The thorax and head of most species are uniformly black, with the abdomen varying between black, red, brown, orange and yellow, with the fist tergit and the outer most tergites most usually black.

Ecology
All species of Dusona are parasitoids, with the main hosts being the larvae of Lepidopterans. The host is usually killed as a prepupa, in a few cases as a pupa. Only one species, Dusona minor, has been reported as a parasitoid of larva outside of Lepidoptera, parasitoidizing the sawfly Monoctenus juniperi.

Species
 Dusona abdominator  Hinz, 1985
 Dusona admontina  (Speiser, 1908)
 Dusona adriaansei  (Teunissen, 1947)
 Dusona aemula  (Forster, 1868)
 Dusona aequorea  Gupta & Gupta, 1977
 Dusona affinis  (Brischke, 1880)
 Dusona affinitor  Hinz, 1979
 Dusona ahlaensis  Gupta & Gupta, 1977
 Dusona alius  (Norton, 1863)
 Dusona alpigena  Hinz, 1972
 Dusona alpina  (Strobl, 1904)
 Dusona alpinator  Hinz & Horstmann, 2004
 Dusona alticola  (Gravenhorst, 1829)
 Dusona alveolata  Gupta & Gupta, 1977
 Dusona americana  (Ashmead, 1890)
 Dusona amurator  Hinz, 1985
 Dusona anceps  (Holmgren, 1860)
 Dusona angustata  (Thomson, 1887)
 Dusona angustifrons  (Forster, 1868)
 Dusona annexa  (Forster, 1868)
 Dusona anomala  (Seyrig, 1935)
 Dusona aquilonaria  Gupta & Gupta, 1977
 Dusona argentea  (Norton, 1863)
 Dusona argentopilosa  (Enderlein, 1921)
 Dusona artonae  (Narendran, 2000)
 Dusona aspera  (Gupta & Gupta, 1976)
 Dusona assita  (Norton, 1863)
 Dusona associata  (Walley, 1940)
 Dusona atriceps  (Cresson, 1865)
 Dusona atricolor  (Szepligeti, 1908)
 Dusona atrotibialis  Horstmann, 2006
 Dusona augasma  (Gupta & Gupta, 1976)
 Dusona auriculator  Aubert, 1964
 Dusona aurifer  (Cresson, 1874)
 Dusona aurita  (Kriechbaumer, 1883)
 Dusona australis  (Walley, 1940)
 Dusona aversa  (Forster, 1868)
 Dusona baueri  Hinz, 1973
 Dusona bellator  Hinz & Horstmann, 2004
 Dusona bellipes  (Holmgren, 1872)
 Dusona bellula  (Dalla Torre, 1901)
 Dusona belokobyli  Hinz & Horstmann, 2004
 Dusona bharata  Gupta & Gupta, 1977
 Dusona bicolor  (Brischke, 1880)
 Dusona bicoloripes  (Ashmead, 1906)
 Dusona brachiator  (Say, 1835)
 Dusona brevicornis  (Brischke, 1880)
 Dusona brevisocrea  Gupta & Gupta, 1977
 Dusona brischkei  (Dalla Torre, 1901)
 Dusona brullei  (Dalla Torre, 1901)
 Dusona bucculenta  (Holmgren, 1860)
 Dusona bucculentoides  Hinz & Horstmann, 2004
 Dusona buddha  (Cameron, 1897)
 Dusona burmensis  Gupta & Gupta, 1977
 Dusona calceata  (Brauns, 1895)
 Dusona cameronii  (Dalla Torre, 1901)
 Dusona canadensis  (Walley, 1940)
 Dusona capitator  Hinz, 1985
 Dusona carinata  Gupta & Gupta, 1977
 Dusona carinator  Hinz, 1979
 Dusona carinifer  (Teunissen, 1947)
 Dusona carinifrons  (Holmgren, 1860)
 Dusona cariniscutis  (Cameron, 1903)
 Dusona carlsoni  Gupta & Gupta, 1977
 Dusona carpathica  (Szepligeti, 1916)
 Dusona carpinellae  (Schrank, 1802)
 Dusona castanipes  (Thomson, 1887)
 Dusona caudator  Hinz, 1985
 Dusona celator  Hinz, 1985
 Dusona ceylonica  (Cameron, 1897)
 Dusona chabarowski  Hinz & Horstmann, 2004
 Dusona chechziri  Hinz & Horstmann, 2004
 Dusona chikaldaensis  Gupta & Gupta, 1977
 Dusona chinensis  Horstmann, 2004
 Dusona circumcinctus  (Forster, 1868)
 Dusona circumspectans  (Forster, 1868)
 Dusona citeria  Gupta & Gupta, 1977
 Dusona collaris  Hinz & Horstmann, 2004
 Dusona confluens  (Walley, 1940)
 Dusona conformis  (Walley, 1940)
 Dusona confusa  (Forster, 1868)
 Dusona confusator  Hinz & Horstmann, 2004
 Dusona consobrina  (Holmgren, 1872)
 Dusona constantineanui  Hinz, 1977
 Dusona contumator  Hinz, 1979
 Dusona contumax  (Forster, 1868)
 Dusona coriacea  Horstmann, 2004
 Dusona cornellus  (Teunissen, 1947)
 Dusona crassicornis  (Provancher, 1886)
 Dusona crassipes  (Thomson, 1887)
 Dusona crassiventris  Horstmann, 2004
 Dusona cressonii  (Dalla Torre, 1901)
 Dusona cultrator  (Gravenhorst, 1829)
 Dusona cytaeis  (Cameron, 1903)
 Dusona debilis  (Forster, 1868)
 Dusona deceptor  (Walley, 1940)
 Dusona definis  Gupta & Gupta, 1977
 Dusona deodarae  (Cushman, 1927)
 Dusona destructor  Wahl, 1991
 Dusona detritor  Hinz & Horstmann, 2004
 Dusona dictor  Hinz, 1979
 Dusona dimidiata  (Brulle, 1846)
 Dusona dimidiata  (Gupta & Gupta, 1976)
 Dusona dineshi  Gupta & Gupta, 1977
 Dusona disclusa  (Forster, 1868)
 Dusona diversa  (Norton, 1863)
 Dusona diversella  (Walley, 1940)
 Dusona diversicolor  (Viereck, 1925)
 Dusona doonensis  Gupta & Gupta, 1977
 Dusona dositheae  (Audouin, 1834)
 Dusona downesi  (Viereck, 1925)
 Dusona dubitor  Hinz, 1977
 Dusona egregia  (Viereck, 1916)
 Dusona einbecki  Hinz, 1977
 Dusona ektypha  Gupta & Gupta, 1977
 Dusona elegans  (Szepligeti, 1908)
 Dusona ellopiae  (Walley, 1929)
 Dusona elongata  (Gupta & Gupta, 1976)
 Dusona epomiata  Gupta & Gupta, 1977
 Dusona erythra  (Uchida, 1932)
 Dusona erythrogaster  (Forster, 1868)
 Dusona erythrospila  (Cameron, 1906)
 Dusona experta  (Cresson, 1872)
 Dusona exsculpta  (Brischke, 1880)
 Dusona extranea  (Turner, 1919)
 Dusona falcator  (Fabricius, 1775)
 Dusona fatigator  (Forster, 1868)
 Dusona femoralis  Gupta & Gupta, 1977
 Dusona ferruginea  Walkley, 1963
 Dusona fervida  (Tosquinet, 1903)
 Dusona filator  Hinz, 1985
 Dusona filicornis  (Holmgren, 1872)
 Dusona flagellator  (Fabricius, 1793)
 Dusona flavescens  (Walley, 1940)
 Dusona flavipennis  (Cresson, 1874)
 Dusona flavitarsis  Horstmann, 2004
 Dusona flavopicta  Horstmann, 2004
 Dusona flinti  Gupta & Gupta, 1977
 Dusona fossata  (Viereck, 1926)
 Dusona fractocristata  (Enderlein, 1921)
 Dusona fuliginosa  (Szepligeti, 1908)
 Dusona fulvicornis  (Cameron, 1906)
 Dusona fundator  (Hinz, 1990)
 Dusona fuscitarsis  (Viereck, 1926)
 Dusona ganeshi  Gupta & Gupta, 1977
 Dusona garhwalensis  (Gupta & Gupta, 1976)
 Dusona gastator  Hinz, 1985
 Dusona gastroides  Horstmann, 2004
 Dusona geminata  Gupta & Gupta, 1977
 Dusona genalis  (Thomson, 1887)
 Dusona genator  Hinz, 1979
 Dusona gephyra  Gupta & Gupta, 1977
 Dusona gibbosa  (Gupta & Gupta, 1976)
 Dusona glabra  Gupta & Gupta, 1977
 Dusona glauca  (Norton, 1863)
 Dusona gnara  (Cresson, 1874)
 Dusona gracilis  (Walley, 1940)
 Dusona grahami  (Walley, 1940)
 Dusona graptor  Hinz, 1985
 Dusona guatemalensis  (Cameron, 1886)
 Dusona habermehli  (Kriechbaumer, 1898)
 Dusona heptahamuli  (Gupta & Gupta, 1976)
 Dusona himachalensis  Gupta & Gupta, 1977
 Dusona himalayensis  (Cameron, 1899)
 Dusona holmgrenii  (Dalla Torre, 1901)
 Dusona horrida  (Hancock, 1926)
 Dusona humilis  (Forster, 1868)
 Dusona impressifrons  Hinz, 1979
 Dusona inclivata  Gupta & Gupta, 1977
 Dusona incompleta  (Bridgman, 1889)
 Dusona inconspicua  Horstmann, 2004
 Dusona indistinctor  Hinz, 1979
 Dusona inermis  (Forster, 1868)
 Dusona infelix  (Dalla Torre, 1901)
 Dusona infesta  (Forster, 1868)
 Dusona infundibulum  Horstmann, 2004
 Dusona insignita  (Forster, 1868)
 Dusona insolita  (Walley, 1940)
 Dusona intelligator  Aubert, 1966
 Dusona interstitialis  (Walley, 1940)
 Dusona iwatae  Hinz, 1994
 Dusona japonica  (Cameron, 1906)
 Dusona johnsoni  (Walley, 1940)
 Dusona juvenilis  (Forster, 1868)
 Dusona juventas  (Morley, 1916)
 Dusona juxta  (Gupta & Gupta, 1976)
 Dusona kalatopensis  Gupta & Gupta, 1977
 Dusona kamathi  Gupta & Gupta, 1977
 Dusona kamrupa  (Gupta & Gupta, 1976)
 Dusona karkil  (Cheesman, 1936)
 Dusona kasparyani  Hinz, 1985
 Dusona kerrichi  (Gupta & Gupta, 1976)
 Dusona korta  (Cheesman, 1953)
 Dusona kriechbaumeri  (Costa, 1884)
 Dusona lacivia  (Cresson, 1874)
 Dusona lajae  Gupta & Gupta, 1977
 Dusona lamellator  Aubert, 1960
 Dusona lamellifer  Hinz, 1994
 Dusona laminata  (Walley, 1940)
 Dusona laticincta  (Cresson, 1865)
 Dusona lautareti  (Hinz, 1990)
 Dusona lecta  (Cresson, 1874)
 Dusona lenticulata  Gupta & Gupta, 1977
 Dusona leptogaster  (Holmgren, 1860)
 Dusona levibasis  Horstmann, 2004
 Dusona libauensis  (Strand, 1918)
 Dusona liberator  Hinz, 1985
 Dusona libertatis  (Teunissen, 1947)
 Dusona linearis  Horstmann, 2004
 Dusona lineola  (Schrottky, 1902)
 Dusona lividariae  Hinz, 1963
 Dusona lobata  (Walley, 1940)
 Dusona longiabdominalis  (Uchida, 1932)
 Dusona longicauda  (Uchida, 1928)
 Dusona longifemorata  (Gupta & Gupta, 1976)
 Dusona longigena  Horstmann, 2004
 Dusona longigenata  Gupta & Gupta, 1977
 Dusona longiseta  Hinz, 1961
 Dusona longistilus  Horstmann, 2004
 Dusona longiterebra  (Gupta & Gupta, 1976)
 Dusona luctuosa  (Provancher, 1875)
 Dusona luteipes  (Thomson, 1887)
 Dusona macrofovea  Iwata, 1960
 Dusona mactatoides  Hinz, 1994
 Dusona mactator  (Forster, 1868)
 Dusona magnifica  (Walley, 1940)
 Dusona major  (Cresson, 1879)
 Dusona malaisei  Gupta & Gupta, 1977
 Dusona marmorata  (Szepligeti, 1908)
 Dusona maruyamae  Hinz, 1994
 Dusona maruyamator  Hinz, 1979
 Dusona matsumurae  (Uchida, 1928)
 Dusona mediator  (Gupta & Gupta, 1976)
 Dusona melanator  Hinz, 1985
 Dusona memorator  Hinz, 1994
 Dusona mercator  (Fabricius, 1793)
 Dusona meridionator  Aubert, 1960
 Dusona meritor  Hinz & Horstmann, 2004
 Dusona mexicana  (Cameron, 1886)
 Dusona micrator  Hinz, 1979
 Dusona mikroschemos  (Gupta & Gupta, 1976)
 Dusona minor  (Provancher, 1879)
 Dusona minuta  (Holmgren, 1856)
 Dusona minutor  Horstmann, 2004
 Dusona miranda  (Szepligeti, 1908)
 Dusona mixta  (Pollich, 1781)
 Dusona momoii  Hinz & Horstmann, 2004
 Dusona montana  (Roman, 1929)
 Dusona montrealensis  (Viereck, 1926)
 Dusona murarii  (Gupta, 1987)
 Dusona myrtilla  (Desvignes, 1856)
 Dusona nagatomii  (Kusigemati, 1990)
 Dusona nanus  Horstmann, 2004
 Dusona nebulosa  Horstmann, 2004
 Dusona negata  (Turner, 1919)
 Dusona nervellator  Horstmann, 2004
 Dusona nidulator  (Fabricius, 1804)
 Dusona nigriapiculata  (Gupta & Gupta, 1976)
 Dusona nigridens  Horstmann, 2004
 Dusona nigridorsum  Horstmann, 2004
 Dusona nigrina  Horstmann, 2004
 Dusona nigritegula  Gupta & Gupta, 1977
 Dusona nigritibialis  (Viereck, 1926)
 Dusona nigritibialis  (Gupta & Gupta, 1976)
 Dusona nitidipleuris  Horstmann, 2004
 Dusona norikurae  Hinz & Horstmann, 2004
 Dusona notabilis  (Forster, 1868)
 Dusona novitia  (Morley, 1913)
 Dusona nubilator  Hinz, 1994
 Dusona nursei  (Cameron, 1907)
 Dusona obesa  (Davis, 1898)
 Dusona obliterata  (Holmgren, 1872)
 Dusona obscurator  Horstmann, 2004
 Dusona obscuripes  Horstmann, 2004
 Dusona obtutor  Hinz, 1994
 Dusona occidentalis  (Davis, 1898)
 Dusona occipita  Gupta & Gupta, 1977
 Dusona ocellata  (Walley, 1940)
 Dusona okadai  (Uchida, 1942)
 Dusona opaca  (Thomson, 1887)
 Dusona opacoides  Hinz, 1985
 Dusona opima  (Cresson, 1874)
 Dusona orientalis  Gupta & Gupta, 1977
 Dusona pahalgamensis  Gupta & Gupta, 1977
 Dusona pallescens  (Walley, 1940)
 Dusona papator  Hinz & Horstmann, 2004
 Dusona parallela  Gupta & Gupta, 1977
 Dusona parva  Horstmann, 2004
 Dusona parvicavata  Horstmann, 2004

References

Ichneumonidae
Ichneumonidae genera